Astraeus is a genus of "jewel beetles" in the subfamily Polycestinae, containing the following species:

 Astraeus aberrans van de Poll, 1886
 Astraeus acaciae Barker, 1999
 Astraeus adamsi Barker, 1975
 Astraeus aridus Barker, 1989
 Astraeus badeni van de Poll, 1889
 Astraeus bakeri Barker, 1975
 Astraeus blackdownensis Barker, 1977
 Astraeus caledonicus Fauvel, 1904
 Astraeus carnabyi Barker, 1975
 Astraeus carteri Barker, 1975
 Astraeus crassus van de Poll, 1889
 Astraeus crockerae Barker, 1977
 Astraeus cyaneus Kerremans, 1900
 Astraeus dedariensis Barker, 1975
 Astraeus dilutipes van de Poll, 1886
 Astraeus elongatus van de Poll, 1886
 Astraeus flavopictus Laporte & Gory, 1837
 Astraeus fraseriensis Barker, 1975
 Astraeus fraterculus van de Poll, 1889
 Astraeus globosus Barker, 1975
 Astraeus goerlingi Barker, 1975
 Astraeus goldingi Barker, 2007
 Astraeus hanloni Barker, 2007
 Astraeus intricatus Carter, 1925
 Astraeus irregularis van de Poll, 1889
 Astraeus jansoni van de Poll, 1889
 Astraeus kitchini Barker, 2004
 Astraeus lineatus van de Poll, 1889
 Astraeus macmillani Barker, 1975
 Astraeus major Blackburn, 1890
 Astraeus mastersii Macleay, 1872
 Astraeus mayoi Barker, 2007
 Astraeus meyricki Blackburn, 1890
 Astraeus minutus Barker, 1975
 Astraeus mourangeensis Barker, 1977
 Astraeus multinotatus van de Poll, 1889
 Astraeus navarchis (Thomson, 1856)
 Astraeus oberthuri van de Poll, 1889
 Astraeus obscurus Barker, 1975
 Astraeus occidentalis Barker, 1989
 Astraeus polli Barker, 1975
 Astraeus powelli Barker, 1995
 Astraeus princeps Barker, 1989
 Astraeus prothoracicus van de Poll, 1889
 Astraeus pygmaeus van de Poll, 1886
 Astraeus robustus Barker, 1975
 Astraeus samouelli Saunders, 1868
 Astraeus simulator van de Poll, 1889
 Astraeus smythi Barker, 1975
 Astraeus sundholmi Barker, 2007
 Astraeus tamminensis Barker, 1975
 Astraeus vittatus van de Poll, 1889
 Astraeus watsoni Barker, 1975
 Astraeus williamsi Barker, 1989
 Astraeus yarrattensis Barker, 1989

References

External links 
 
 

Buprestidae genera